John Roberts (born 23 September 1956) is a former Australian rules footballer who played with South Melbourne in the Victorian Football League (VFL). He was the club's leading goal kicker in 1980 and 1981.

Roberts holds the record for the most goals kicked in a game at Football Park in Adelaide when he kicked 16 goals in a game for Woodville in the 1977 SANFL season. He later went on to play full forward for North Adelaide in their 1987 SANFL Grand Final win over Glenelg at Football Park. He also won the Ken Farmer Medal as the SANFL's leading goal kicker in 1987 with 111 goals.

References

External links

 

1956 births
Living people
Australian rules footballers from South Australia
Sydney Swans players
Woodville Football Club players
West Torrens Football Club players
North Adelaide Football Club players
South Australian State of Origin players
All-Australians (1953–1988)